Hasemania is a genus of characins endemic to Brazil, where only found in river basins that originate on the Brazilian Shield, ranging west to the Juruena system, north to the São Francisco system and south to the Paraná system. The individual species generally have quite small ranges and two, H. crenuchoides and H. piatan, are considered threatened by Brazil's Ministry of the Environment.

Species
There are currently 9 recognized species in this genus:

 Hasemania crenuchoides Zarske & Géry, 1999
 Hasemania hanseni (Fowler, 1949)
 Hasemania kalunga Bertaco & F. R. de Carvalho, 2010
 Hasemania maxillaris Durbin, 1911
 Hasemania melanura Durbin, 1911 (Copper tetra)
 Hasemania nambiquara Bertaco & L. R. Malabarba, 2007
 Hasemania nana (Lütken, 1875) (Silvertip tetra)
 Hasemania piatan Zanata & J. P. Serra, 2010
 Hasemania uberaba J. P. Serra & Langeani, 2015

References

Characidae
Fish of South America
Fish of Brazil
Endemic fauna of Brazil
Taxa named by Marion Durbin Ellis